Carmen Gertrude Short (April 6, 1902 – July 31, 1968) was an American film actress of the silent and early sound era. She appeared in more than 130 films between 1912 and 1945.

Biography
 

Carmen Gertrude Short was born in Cincinnati, Ohio, and died in Hollywood, California, aged 66, from a heart attack. One of her siblings was actor Antrim Short. Actress Blanche Sweet was a cousin.

Selected filmography

 Hearts in Conflict (1912 short) 
 Cinders (1913 short)
 The Sea Urchin (1913 short)
 The Honor of the Mounted (1914 short)
 The Embezzler (1914 short)
 The Test (1914)
 The Cowboy and the Lady (1915)
 The Little Princess (1917)
 The Only Road (1918)
 Riddle Gawne (1918)
 In Mizzoura (1919)
 Blackie's Redemption (1919)
 You Never Can Tell (1920)
 She Couldn't Help It (1920)
 Cinderella's Twin (1920)
 The Blot (1921)
 Leap Year (1921)
 Fool's Paradise (1921)
 Rent Free (1922)
 Headin' West (1922)
 The Prisoner (1923)
 Breaking Into Society (1923) 
 The Man Life Passed By (1923)
 Crinoline and Romance (1923)
 The Narrow Street (1925)
 Tessie (1925)
 The People vs. Nancy Preston (1925)
 The Other Woman's Story (1925)
 Ladies of Leisure (1926)
 The Lily (1926)
 Sweet Adeline (1926)
 Adam and Evil (1927)
 The Masked Woman (1927)
 Polly of the Movies (1927)
 Ladies at Ease (1927)
 The Show (1927)
 Tillie the Toiler (1927)
 The Three Outcasts (1929)
 Gold Diggers of Broadway (1929)
 Bulldog Drummond (1929)
 Take 'em and Shake 'em (1931)
 Laughing Sinners (1931) 
 Gigolettes (1932)
 Niagara Falls (1932)
Secret Sinners (1933)
 Love Birds (1934)
 The Thin Man (1934)
 Penny Wisdom (1937)

References

External links

1902 births
1968 deaths
20th-century American actresses
American film actresses
American silent film actresses
Actresses from Cincinnati